VeggieWorld are annual vegan food and clothing festivals held in numerous locations around Europe and Asia. VeggieWorld is one of the biggest Vegan/Vegetarian festivals in the world, and one of the biggest such fairs, with on average 8,000 visitors (compared with 14,500 visitors at the 2018 London Vegfest). The first VeggieWorld festival was held in Wiesbaden in 2011, hosted by ProVeg Deutschland (known as Vegetarierbund Deutschland until 2017).

Locations 
These festivals take place in the following countries: cities:  
 Germany: Düsseldorf (since 2015), Berlin (since 2015), Frankfurt & Wiesbaden (since 2011), Hamburg, Cologne (since 2019), Munich, Karlsruhe (since 2023)
 France: Paris, Lyon
 Netherlands: Utrecht (since 2016)
 Switzerland: Zurich

Editions 
10 editions of VeggieWorld have been held in Wiesbaden from 2011 to 2020, with the last attracting 13,000 visitors. The next edition is scheduled to take place in 2021 in Frankfurt.

VeggieWorld Berlin was first held in 2015 with 55 stands, which grew to 130 stands in 2019. The 2019 edition saw 10,000 visitors.

VeggieWorld Utrecht has been organised by ProVeg Nederland (known as Viva Las Vega's until 2017) since 2016. The first edition attracted over 7,600 visitors, making it the largest vegan fair in the Netherlands. The 2020 edition attracted 9,000 visitors.

VeggieWorld Paris 2019 was the 7th Parisian edition and attracted over 8,000 visitors, which was 14% more than the 6th. The 3rd edition of VeggieWorld Lyon was held in 2019.

See also
 List of vegetarian festivals
 European Vegetarian Union
 International Vegetarian Union
 Veganmania
 World Vegan Day
 World Vegetarian Day
 List of food days

References

External links
 

Veganism
Vegetarian festivals